On 17 February 2023, an abandoned lorry carrying illegal immigrants believed to be from Afghanistan as well as timber was discovered near Lokorsko, a village 12 miles north-east of Sofia in Sofia City Province, Bulgaria. 

Eighteen of the immigrants were dead and 34 others were taken to hospitals in Sofia. The deceased died due to a combination of lack of oxygen in an enclosed space and difficulty breathing due to the tight quarters. Bulgarian police arrested four people. Six people were charged with human trafficking charges shortly after the discovery, which included the truck driver and his companion.

See also
2022 San Antonio migrant deaths
Chiapas truck crash
Gualaca bus crash
List of migrant vehicle incidents in Europe

References

Sofia City Province
Migrant disasters in Europe
February 2023 events in Bulgaria
Afghanistan–Bulgaria relations
European migrant crisis
2023 disasters in Bulgaria
Deaths from hypothermia